Lynch Point is a rocky point at the seaward end of the peninsula between Frostman Glacier and Hull Glacier on the coast of Marie Byrd Land, Antarctica. It was photographed from United States Antarctic Service (1939–41) aircraft on December 18, 1940, and was mapped by the United States Geological Survey from surveys and U.S. Navy air photos, 1959–65. The point was named by the Advisory Committee on Antarctic Names for Ensign William R. Lynch II, U.S. Navy Reserve, Damage Control Officer aboard  in exploring these coastal waters, 1961–62.

References

Headlands of Marie Byrd Land